The Life and Adventures of Nicholas Nickleby (also known simply as Nicholas Nickleby) is a 1947 British drama film directed by Alberto Cavalcanti and starring Cedric Hardwicke. The screenplay by John Dighton is based on the Charles Dickens novel The Life and Adventures of Nicholas Nickleby (1839). This first sound screen adaptation of the book followed silent films released in 1903 and 1912.

Plot
After the father of a family dies, leaving the wife and children with no source of income, Nicholas Nickleby, with his mother and his younger sister Kate, travel to London to seek help from their wealthy but cold-hearted uncle Ralph, a money-lender. Ralph arranges for Nicholas to be hired as a tutor, and finds Kate work as a seamstress. Nicholas meets his new employer Mr. Squeers just as he concludes his daily business with Mr. Snawley, who is "boarding" his two unwanted stepsons.

Nicholas is horrified to discover that his employers, the sadistic Mr. and Mrs. Squeers, run their boarding school, Dotheboys Hall in Yorkshire, like a prison. They physically, verbally, and emotionally abuse their young charges on a regular basis. Nicholas eventually rebels and escapes, taking with him young friend – the crippled Smike.

Nicholas and Smike take lodgings with Newman Noggs, Ralph Nickleby's clerk. Nicholas tries to find a job, but rejects a low-paying position as a politician's secretary. A job as a tutor of French for the Kenwig daughters comes to comic disaster. He and Smike decide to search for work elsewhere. As they are leaving the city, they make the acquaintance of Madeline Bray, the sole support of her father, who gambled away his fortune and now is indebted to Nicholas's uncle.

In search of food and lodging, they stop at an inn, and the proprietor introduces them to actor-manager Vincent Crummles, who owns and operates a travelling theatrical troupe with his actress wife. Crummles hires the two as actors and casts them in a production of Romeo and Juliet, in which they are successful.

Nicholas decides to return to London after he receives a letter from Noggs, who urges him to come back as quickly as possible as his uncle has put his sister in great jeopardy despite his promise to make certain they come to no harm. Kate has been subjected to unwanted attention from Sir Mulberry Hawk and Lord Verisopht, clients of her uncle, and when Nicholas overhears them bawdily discussing her in a tavern he is determined to defend his sister's honour. Hawk refuses Nicholas's demand to "step outside", and they fight in Hawk's carriage, resulting in an accident in which Hawk is injured. Hawk and Lord Verisopht argue over Hawk's lack of honour, and Hawk kills Lord Verisopht in a duel with pistols. As a result, Ralph Nickleby loses £6,000, owed to him by Verisopht, much to the delight of Noggs, who harbours a hidden desire for revenge against his employer.

Nicholas then finds employment as a clerk with the portly, benevolent, twin brothers Cheeryble, whose nephew Frank begins to court Kate. They provide him a cottage in which Nicholas can place his family and Smike, who has been accepted warmly by all. Meanwhile, Squeers returns to London, planning to capture Smike and bring him back to Dotheboys Hall, and is engaged by Ralph Nickleby to stalk Nicholas and Smike. Squeers and Mr. Snawley make off with Smike "on the wishes of his father". Nicholas, aided by Noggs, intercepts them and foils the plot. Smike, severely beaten by Squeers, is nursed by Kate and falls in love with her.

Nicholas meets Madeline a third time when the Cheerybles assign Nicholas to help her situation, in secrecy from her father. His uncle has been trying to coerce her father into giving Ralph her hand in marriage in exchange for settlement of his debt, and Mr. Bray finally accedes. Noggs warns Nicholas, who arrives at the Bray lodgings to find Madeline, unhappily dressed in a wedding gown, awaiting her fate. In a showdown with Ralph, Kate reveals to Madeline the true nature of Ralph Nickleby's character. Madeline's father is found dead in his bedroom, Madeline faints and Nicholas carries her away, warning Ralph to leave her alone as she is now free of all obligations.

Ralph's hatred of Nicholas makes him determined to ruin him, but he is brought up short by Noggs, who has realised from the facts told him by Nicholas that Smike is actually Ralph's son, whom Ralph had secretly put in the charge of a poor family, who kept the money he paid them but sent the boy to Dotheboys. Ralph's hold over Noggs has compelled him to harbour the secret for fifteen years. Smike was sent away after his mother's death, using a forged birth certificate, so that Ralph could keep her inheritance rather than let their child have it, as dictated by law. Further, Squeers hired Snawley to act the part of Smike's father to make his kidnapping appear legal. Noggs delights in telling Ralph that Squeers has confessed the conspiracy to the authorities, and Ralph now faces prison and financial ruin.

Smike, fallen into hopelessness because Kate is in love with Frank, succumbs to his various ailments and dies just before Ralph arrives at Smike's deathbed. The police come to Ralph's house to arrest him. Ralph flees to his garret and hangs himself. True love prevails, and Nicholas and Madeline and Kate and Frank are wed.

Cast

Cedric Hardwicke as Ralph Nickleby
Stanley Holloway as Vincent Crummles
Derek Bond as Nicholas Nickleby
Mary Merrall as Mrs Catherine Nickleby
Sally Ann Howes as Kate Nickleby
Aubrey Woods as Smike
Jill Balcon as Madeline Bray
Bernard Miles as Newman Noggs
Alfred Drayton as Wackford Squeers
Sybil Thorndike as Mrs Squeers
Vera Pearce as Mrs. Crummles
James Hayter as Ned and Charles Cheeryble
Emrys Jones as Frank Cheeryble 
Cecil Ramage as Sir Mulberry Hawk 
Timothy Bateson as Lord Verisopht
George Relph as Mr Bray
Frederick Burtwell as Sheriff Murray
Patricia Hayes as Phoebe

Reception

Box office
According to trade papers, the film was a "notable box office attraction" at British cinemas in 1947.

Critical response
Bosley Crowther of The New York Times wrote that "comparison to Great Expectations puts it somewhat in the shade, mainly because the former was so much more exciting as to plot and a good bit more satisfying in the nature and performance of its characters." Crowther considered it "a good whole cut below that of Great Expectations and its tension is nowhere near as well sustained", adding that there was a "failure to get real pace or tension in the film's last half." He highlighted the "compression of details and incidents compelled by John Dighton's script", believing this "overabundance also hampers the rounding of characters".

In a retrospective review, Time Out London argued that "Cavalcanti makes surprisingly little of the surreal possibilities of this convoluted Dickensian nightmare." The review acknowledged "an impressively atmospheric Victorian London, but stylish visuals hardly compensate for the flat, cursory rendering of some of Dickens' best drawn characters." However, the review praised the performances of Cedric Hardwicke and Bernard Miles, who were "given enough space to establish a proper presence." Time Out concluded, "Meagre and one-dimensional, the film is finally smothered by Ealing's cosy sentimentality".

References

External links
 
 
 
Review of film at Variety

1947 films
1947 drama films
British black-and-white films
British drama films
Ealing Studios films
Films based on Nicholas Nickleby
Films directed by Alberto Cavalcanti
Films produced by Michael Balcon
Films set in London
1940s British films
1940s English-language films